Keep Your Heart is the full-length debut studio album by the punk rock band The Loved Ones. It was released on February 21, 2006 by Fat Wreck Chords. Among the 13 tracks on the album, one, "100K", originally appeared on their EP, The Loved Ones from the year before and two, "Jane" and "Arsenic" originally appeared on their self-released demo from 2004. Also, "Benson and Hedges" was originally done by The Curse, which was a band Dave Hause was in before The Loved Ones.

An outtake from the album, "Spy Diddley", had been featured on the band's MySpace page and was released on Fat Wreck Chords' X-Mas Bonus digital sampler. The track was later released on their Distractions EP in 2009.

Track listing

All songs by Dave Hause and The Loved Ones.
 "Suture Self" – 2:37
 "Breathe In" – 2:32
 "Jane" – 2:55
 "Over 50 Club" – 1:13
 "Please Be Here" – 2:28
 "Hurry Up and Wait" – 2:28
 "Sickening" – 3:33
 "Living Will (Get You Dead)" – 2:06
 "The Odds" – 2:47
 "Benson and Hedges" – 2:10
 "Arsenic" – 2:58
 "100K" – 2:44
 "Player Hater Anthem" – 3:32

Credits
 Dave Hause – vocals, guitar
 Michael Cotterman – bass
 Mike Sneeringer – drums

References 

2006 albums
Fat Wreck Chords albums
The Loved Ones (American band) albums